The 11th season of the FA Women's Premier League.

National Division

Northern Division

Southern Division

1 - Newport County changed its name to Merthyr Tydfil.

2 - while Barry Town (relegated from the first level) folded before the season began.

References

RSSSF

Eng
FA Women's National League seasons
Wom
1